Vice-Admiral Sir Norman Egbert Denning,  (19 November 1904 – 27 December 1979) was a Royal Naval and Intelligence Officer at the Admiralty and Defence Intelligence Staff who served as Director of Naval Planning from 1945 to 1956, Director of Naval Intelligence from 1960 to 1964, and Deputy Chief of the Defence Staff for Intelligence from 1964 to 1965. Denning was a prominent and pioneering figure in naval and military intelligence and established a successful career during and after the Second World War, holding many senior ranking staff positions.

Early life
He was born to Charles and Clara Denning in 1904, in Whitchurch (Hampshire) in the accommodation above his parents shop. He had 4 older brothers and 1 sister. His four older brothers joined the British Armed Forces during the Great War, although only two returned, Alfred Thompson 'Tom' Denning and Reginald Denning.

Educated at Andover Grammar School and like his brothers he joined up. Norman joined the forces, choosing the Royal Navy shortly after the end of World War I; despite his bad eyesight he was accepted into the Paymaster Branch. He served as secretary to various senior figures and also worked in supplying naval vessels, but quickly became an expert on naval intelligence. For several years in the early 1930s he served in Singapore and while there was surprised by the number of Japanese fishing and research boats around Singapore, and from his research concluded that the Japanese were in a position where they were able to attack Singapore by land, rather than sea as the British defence plans assumed. He wrote a report and submitted it to the Director of Naval Intelligence, but it was dismissed as him 'over-exercising his imagination'. In 1937 was appointed to the Naval Intelligence Division and attempted to reform the division using lessons learnt from World War I. He was assisted in this by his discovery of a room of old Naval Intelligence papers from World War I and its aftermath, including studies by staff members as to how the unit could be used more effectively and what lessons should be learnt from the use of intelligence-gathering in the war.

Wartime career
In 1939, with the permission of James Troup, Director of Naval Intelligence from 1935 to 1939, and John Henry Godfrey, Director of Naval Intelligence from 1939 to 1943, the then Lieutenant Commander Denning formulated and established the Operational Intelligence Centre (OIC) for the Navy based at the Admiralty Citadel in London. The OIC became a key and vital element for the British intelligence services, coordinating efforts between decryption units such as the Government Code and Cypher School and the staff and command officers planning operations. Furthermore, Denning was one of the first intelligence officers to recognise the potential of photographic reconnaissance as a worthwhile intelligence source. Consequently, Denning helped persuade the heads of the Royal Air Force to allow the Australian officer Sidney Cotton's pioneering unit, the RAF Photographic Development Unit and then No. 1 Photographic Reconnaissance Unit RAF to be used for intelligence-gathering.

Later career
Denning was appointed Officer of the Order of the British Empire (OBE) for his work in 1945, and after the war was made Director of Planning for the Admiralty. He became Director of the Royal Naval College, Greenwich in 1956 and in 1958 became Deputy Chief of Naval Personnel, (Training). In 1959 he became Director of Manpower and in 1960 he was made Director of the Naval Intelligence Division, becoming the first non-executive officer to be promoted to that position. He was appointed Companion of the Order of the Bath (CB) in the 1961 New Year Honours, and promoted Knight Commander of the Order of the British Empire (KBE) in the 1963 New Year Honours. In 1964 he was made Deputy Chief of the Defence Staff for Intelligence. 

He retired from the Navy in 1967 and became head of the Defence and Security Media Advisory Committee. After his retirement he spent most of his time at his home in Micheldever, and occasionally gave lectures at institutions both in the United Kingdom and overseas. He died on 27 December 1979; after separating a pair of fighting dogs he was bitten on the hand, and the resulting tetanus jab caused a reaction which set off a heart attack.

Personal life
He married Iris Curtis in 1933, with whom he had two sons and a daughter. His eldest son John followed him into the navy and joined the Royal Fleet Auxiliary, dying in 1975 after a fall. He was buried next to his eldest sons ashes within the Micheldever churchyard.

Some Family records have been donated to the Winchester museum and are available for public access.

References

Bibliography

|-

1904 births
1979 deaths
Companions of the Order of the Bath
Directors of Naval Intelligence
Knights Commander of the Order of the British Empire
Royal Navy vice admirals
Royal Navy officers of World War II
People from Whitchurch, Hampshire
Military personnel from Hampshire
Royal Navy logistics officers